Razor Hollow is a valley in northwest Shannon County in the U.S. state of Missouri. The intermittent stream in the hollow flows northeast and enters the Current River about two miles southeast of Cedargrove and the confluence of Big Creek with the Current.

Razor Hollow was so named on account of sharp rocks in the valley.

References

Valleys of Shannon County, Missouri
Valleys of Missouri